The Sillaro (Latin Silarus, Emilian Sàrrel, Romagnol Sélar) is a  long Italian stream, whose headwaters are by the village of Piancaldoli (Firenzuola, province of Florence), in Tuscany. It runs northeast through the city of Castel San Pietro Terme, Province of Bologna in Emilia Romagna. The river runs through a short extension of the province of Ravenna extending into the province of Bologna before re-entering the province of Bologna. It then forms the border between the province of Ferrara and the province of Ravenna for a short distance before entering the province of Ferrara. The river ends as a tributary of the Reno River by the village of San Biagio di Argenta and near where the Idice enters the Reno. Historically its course formed the boundary between Emilia and Romagna.

References

External links

Rivers of the Province of Florence
Rivers of the Province of Bologna
Rivers of the Province of Ravenna
Rivers of the Province of Ferrara
Rivers of the Apennines
Rivers of Italy